Paul Harrison (born 11 December 1966) is an Australian former weightlifter. He competed in the men's middleweight event at the 1988 Summer Olympics.

References

External links
 

1966 births
Living people
Australian male weightlifters
Olympic weightlifters of Australia
Weightlifters at the 1988 Summer Olympics
Place of birth missing (living people)
20th-century Australian people
21st-century Australian people